Lucas Mario Horvat (born 13 October 1985) is a footballer who plays as a midfielder for FC Gamlitz. Born in Argentina, he represented Slovenia internationally.

Club career
Before starting his professional career, Horvat went through the youth football selections of Argentinos Juniors and River Plate. After taking part in the 2004 football tournament for Slovenes living abroad, he signed his first contract with Factor, a team that was then playing in the Slovenian Second League. In the second half of the 2005–06 season, he was sent on loan to Drava Ptuj. After a successful performance during the loan period, he was offered and signed a four-year contract with the new team. Over the course of three seasons, Horvat made 86 league appearances and scored five goals for Drava. On 11 July 2009 he signed a two-year contract with Interblock.

In January 2012, Horvat signed a two-year contract with Baku of the Azerbaijan Premier League. In February 2015 Horvat returned to Domžale.

On 4 December 2016, Horvat signed a one-year contract with Kazakhstan Premier League side Okzhetpes for the 2017 season.

Career statistics

Club

Honours

Domžale
Slovenian Cup: 2010–11
Slovenian Supercup: 2011

Baku
Azerbaijan Cup: 2011–12

References

External links
Player profile at NZS 

1985 births
Living people
Footballers from Buenos Aires
Argentine people of Slovenian descent
Slovenian footballers
Association football midfielders
Slovenian Second League players
Slovenian PrvaLiga players
Azerbaijan Premier League players
Kazakhstan Premier League players
NK IB 1975 Ljubljana players
NK Drava Ptuj players
NK Domžale players
FC Baku players
FC Okzhetpes players
NK Aluminij players
Slovenian expatriate footballers
Expatriate footballers in Azerbaijan
Expatriate footballers in Kazakhstan
Expatriate footballers in Austria
Slovenian expatriate sportspeople in Azerbaijan
Slovenian expatriate sportspeople in Austria
Slovenia under-21 international footballers